Gamaret is a variety of red wine grape. It was created by André Jaquinet at Station Fédérale de Recherches en Production Végétale de Changins in 1970 by crossing Gamay and Reichensteiner. Gamaret was developed for cultivation in French Switzerland, and is a full sibling of Garanoir, which was intended for the German part of the country.

Gamaret has good resistance to rot and ripens early. It gives dark purple wine with aromas of blackberries and spices and subtle tannin.

Synonyms
The only synonym of Gamaret is Pully B-13.

References

Red wine grape varieties